Dexter Lee (born 18 January 1991) is a Jamaican sprinter who specialises in the 100 and 200 metres. He became the first athlete to win back-to-back titles at World Junior Championships in Athletics when he won the 100 metres in 2008 and 2010.

Career

In 2006, his first international appearance ended with the win of two gold medals (100 metres, and 4x100 metres relay) at the CARIFTA Games.,  followed by three gold medals (100 metres, 200 metres, and 4x100 metres relay) at the 2007 CARIFTA Games.  He won the 100 metres at the 2007 World Youth Championships in Athletics in a time of 10.51 seconds, before backing that up with the 100 metre title at the 2008 World Junior Championships in 10.40 seconds. In 2010, he won the 100 metres at the championships in Moncton with a time of 10.21 seconds. He was disqualified after a false start in the 200 m first round heats. He also won a silver medal in the 4 × 100 m relay at the 2010 World Junior Championships in Athletics.

In October 2009, Lee moved to Atlanta, Georgia, where he joined a training group that includes two-time Olympic 200m champion Veronica Campbell-Brown. He has plans to enroll in a junior college in Atlanta.

Lee is a former student of Herbert Morrison Technical High School in Montego Bay. He is one of nine children—seven boys and two girls—and his older brother Keniel was himself a finalist in the Jamaican high school championships 100 metres.

Personal Bests

Achievements

References

External links

1991 births
Living people
People from Montego Bay
Jamaican male sprinters
Athletes (track and field) at the 2015 Pan American Games
World Athletics Championships winners
Pan American Games competitors for Jamaica